Incubus is a 1982 Canadian supernatural slasher film directed by John Hough and written by George Franklin, based on the 1976 novel of the same name by Ray Russell. It stars John Cassavetes, Kerrie Keane, and John Ireland. The plot focuses on a small Wisconsin town where a mysterious figure is raping and murdering young women. Its title is sometimes extended to The Incubus.

Plot 
In a lake at a rock quarry in rural Wisconsin, a young woman, Mandy Pullman, and her boyfriend, Roy, are swimming. The two spend the night at the lake camping, but are attacked by an unseen figure; Roy is killed, and Mandy violently raped. Mandy is taken to the hospital with a ruptured uterus and serious trauma. As the attack occurs, teenager Tim Galen experiences a recurring nightmare he has in which a woman is tortured by a monstrous figure; his grandmother, Agatha Galen, tries to dissuade him of his suspicions about the premonitory dream. At the hospital, Mandy is treated by Dr. Sam Cordell, a surgeon and physician in the small community of Galen.

Sam's teenage daughter, Jenny, is dating Tim, but he disapproves of their relationship. At the hospital, Sheriff Hank Walden questions Sam about Mandy's injuries, and a nosy local reporter, Laura Kincaid, arrives to question Walden, who forces her to leave. That night at the local library and museum, a librarian, Carolyn Davies, is brutally raped and murdered while closing the building. During her autopsy, Sam finds she suffered similar wounds as Mandy, and finds an inexplicable amount of semen in her vagina.

Attempts to question the comatose Mandy about her attacker are futile. Sam shows Laura pictures of his deceased second wife and notes their amazing resemblance to each other. The following day, local farmer Ernie Barnes and his two daughters are brutally slain at their farmhouse. Tim again is tormented by his vision, and runs into a local movie theater in an attempt to distract himself. While he is there, a young woman is raped and murdered in the downstairs bathroom of the theater, and the metal stall door is found nearly bent in half. Sheriff Walden and Sam arrive at the crime scene shortly before Laura, who insists she may be able to help the investigation. She confides in Sam that she discovered historical records detailing Satanism and similar crimes occurring throughout the town's history.

Tim confronts Jenny at her home, hysterical, and says he believes his dreams are responsible for the crimes. Sam gets a sample of Tim's semen to compare against that which was found inside the victims, but they do not match. Tim and Agatha meet with Sam, Jenny, Laura, and Sheriff Walden at the library that night, where Laura reads a passage from a book detailing the shapeshifter known as the incubus, which manifests through dreams and can appear in human form. Agatha reveals that Tim's mother had died before his birth and had been accused of witchcraft due to psychic powers she possessed; Agatha claims that the Galen family has a legacy of witch hunters, and that his dreams are a result of this.

Laura and Tim return with Sam and Jenny to their home. As Laura takes Jenny upstairs to go to bed, Sam attempts to induce Tim's dream to prove its connection to the murders. Tim goes into a seizure-like state and runs upstairs into Jenny's room where he tries to attack Laura with a dagger given to him by Agatha, but Sam intervenes and stabs him to death. Laura then approaches Sam, and her face briefly shifts into that of the monstrous incubus; it is revealed that Laura has in fact been the incubus all along, manifesting in female form. As Laura embraces Sam, he looks over her shoulder to see Jenny's dead body lying on her bed, blood pouring out from between her legs.

Cast

Production
Incubus was shot near Toronto, Ontario over a period of ten weeks.

The film features the British hard rock band Samson in the form of archival clips taken from the film Biceps of Steel that appear onscreen during a sequence set in a movie theater.

Release
The film was released regionally in the United States in the late summer of 1982, with screenings beginning in Tucson, Arizona as early as August 3, 1982. It later opened in Phoenix on August 27, 1982, before expanding to cities in New Jersey and California during the autumn of 1982.

Critical response
Vincent Canby of The New York Times wrote the film: "is a supernatural horror film about rape, a subject that the R-rated movie takes a firm stand against even as it's smacking its lips. Most of the time the incubus looks like an ordinary human being but, at the end, when it's seen for the first time as its true self, it looks like a large, shaggy, extremely mean E.T. with bad teeth."

Ed Blank of the Pittsburgh Press criticized the film's plot and direction, but conceded the musical score as "chilling." Rick Kogan of The Journal News deemed the film "mindlessly bloody, crudely made and distasteful," concluding that it was "vile and mean-spirited." The Atlanta Constitutions Eleanor Ringel similarly noted the film's overt violence, deeming it "disturbingly nasty, [but] not so poorly done that you can completely shrug it off." She was critical of the screenplay, however, concluding that the film "tries to resolve itself in the last three minutes."

In his 1983 book The Best, Worst, and Most Unusual: Horror Films, Darrell Moore notes: "The film never really decided whether it wanted to be a satanic movie or a slasher movie or a mystery, and none of the many subplots, including one about Cassavetes accidentally killing his first wife, go anywhere." Tom Pym, writing in 1998 for the Time Out Film Guide, unfavorably assessed the film, referring to it as "a demon-rape flick of unusually high technical ineptitude, even for this egregious genre." Film scholar John Kenneth Muir called the film a "mildly effective horror film" despite its "incomprehensible plot," resulting in a film "more dull than exciting in long stretches." In the 2005 TLA Video & DVD Guide, the film was awarded one out of five stars, deemed "boring, confusing, and not very exciting."

Home media
The Incubus was released on DVD in 2002 by Elite Entertainment. It was subsequently released on DVD by Scorpion Releasing under their Katarina's Nightmare Theater label in 2013. On October 30, 2018, Vinegar Syndrome released a region-free special edition Blu-ray of the film.

Notes

References

Sources

External links
 

1980s slasher films
1980s monster movies
1982 horror films
1982 films
Canadian slasher films
Canadian supernatural horror films
English-language Canadian films
Films about nightmares
Films about shapeshifting
Films based on American novels
Films based on horror novels
Films based on mythology
Films directed by John Hough
Films scored by Stanley Myers
Films set in Wisconsin
Films shot in Ontario
Supernatural slasher films
1980s English-language films
1980s Canadian films